There are dozens of ethnic groups in Guizhou province of China that are not officially recognized. These ethnic groups and their languages include:
Caijia 蔡家
Chuanlan 穿兰: over 300,000 people classified as Han, in Anshun Prefecture; many also speak Bouyei and Miao
Chuanqing 穿青: 500,000–1,000,000 people classified as Han, mostly in Zhijin and Nayong, but also in Dafang, Shuicheng, Guanling, Qingzhen, Puding, and Liuzhi counties of Guizhou; has some non-Chinese loanwords
Limin 里民: 50,000–100,000 people classified as Yi and sometimes as Li, in Liuzhi, Guanling, Pu'an, Xingren, Zhenning, and Anlong counties of western Guizhou; most have shifted to Southwestern Mandarin, with few Limin speakers remaining. Also in Qinglong (Qinglong County Gazetteer 1993). Wang (2011) has researched ethnic Limin villages including Fanhua Village 凡化村, Pogong Township 坡贡镇, Guanling County.
Liujia : 4,000 (1999) people classified as Han, in Congjiang County, Guizhou. Hou Jingrong (2009) considers the Liujia language to be a Yue Chinese dialect. In Guangxi, Liujia is spoken in Sanjiang County (in Guyi 古宜, Zhouping 周坪, and Chengcun 程村) and Rongshui County (in Dalang and Danian ).
Longjia 龙家
Lu 卢: 3,000–6,000 people classified as Manchu, in Dafang, Qianxi (in Fuyuan 附源村 of Jinpo 金坡乡), and Bijie counties, Guizhou; also in Anluo 安洛, Jinsha County; the Lu now speak Southwestern Mandarin. In Qianxi County, the ethnic Manchu (pop. 916 as of 1990) are known as Lu'eren 禄额子, Luren 禄人, and Yuanren 原人, and are distributed in Huangni Township 黄泥乡 of Shachang District 沙厂区, as well as Dashui 大水, Gamu 嘎木乡, and Shachang 沙厂镇. Subdivisions include the White Luren 白卢人 and Black Luren 黑卢人.
Nanjing people 南京人: 120,000 people classified as Bai, in Bijie, Dafang (in Shagou 沙沟村 and Dongfeng 东丰村), Liupanshui, Qianxi, Weining, Jinsha, Nayong, Anshun, Qingzhen, and Zhijin counties of western Guizhou; some speak the Longjia language. Ertang Township 二塘乡, Zhongshan District 钟山区 has a population of 2,262 Nanjingren, with a total of 2,936 in Liupanshui prefecture; historical names include Longjiazi 龙家子/龙架子 and Longgedou 龙格兜. Their autonym in Qianxi County is Xienan 写南, and Xiejing 写京 in Dafang County (Zhenxiong County Gazetteer 1987:447). In Xixiu District, Anshun, the Nanjingren are also called the Yingtian 应天. In Zhenxiong County, Yunnan, their autonyms include Awupu 阿乌浦 and Awudu 阿乌堵 (You 2013:134).
Qixingmin 七姓民
Shenzhou 神州: 4,000 (1999) people classified as Han, in Anshun Prefecture; has some non-Chinese loanwords
Tunbao 屯堡: archaic Chinese dialect spoken in Anshun Prefecture. Long, et al. (2011) covers the Tunbao dialect of Jiuxi Village, Daxiqiao Township, Anshun.

References

See also
Ethnic minorities in China
Unrecognized ethnic groups in China
Kam-Sui languages#Other languages

Ethnic groups in China
Guizhou